Shepherd's Symphony – Hirtensymphonie is the nineteenth album by Popol Vuh. It was originally released in 1997 on Mystic Records. In 2004 SPV re-released the album with a different cover (designed by Frank Fiedler). The 1995 semi-documentary Kailash – Pilgerfahrt zum Thron der Götter, directed by Popol Vuh member Frank Fiedler, includes several edited version of the tracks that would later be released on the album.

Track listing 
All tracks composed by Florian Fricke and Guido Hieronymus except where noted.

 "Shepherds of the Future - Die Hirten der Zukunft" – 6:08
 "Short Visit to the Great Sorcerer - Kurzer Besuch beim Großen Zauberer" – 6:02
 "Wild Vine" – 8:29
 "Shepherd's Dream - Der Traum des Schäfers" – 4:17
 "Eternal Love" – 8:18
 "Dance of the Menads - Tanz der Menaden" – 6:24
 "YES" (Hieronymus) – 5:02

Personnel 

Florian Fricke – piano
Guido Hieronymus – keyboards, electric guitar
Frank Fiedler – synthesizer

Credits 
Recorded at Afro Sounds Studio, Munich, September 1995 - March 1996 
Engineered by Guido Hieronymus 
Sound consultant: Johannes Fricke 
Produced by Popol Vuh 
Executive producer: Gerhard Augustin

Project co-ordination: Don McKay and Robert Barrs-James

External links 
 http://www.furious.com/perfect/populvuh.html (Comprehensive article & review of every album, in English)
 https://web.archive.org/web/20080119183134/http://www.enricobassi.it/popvuhdiscografia90.htm (featuring the original credits)
http://www.venco.com.pl/~acrux/shepherd.htm

Popol Vuh (band) albums
1997 albums